This article is a list of people associated with Newcastle University as either a student or teacher.

A 

 Ali Mohamed Shein, 7th President of Zanzibar 
 Richard Adams - fairtrade businessman
 Kate Adie - journalist
 Yasmin Ahmad - Malaysian film director, writer and scriptwriter
 Prince Adewale Aladesanmi - Nigerian prince and businessman
 Jane Alexander - Bishop
 Theodosios Alexander (BSc Marine Engineering 1981) - Dean, Parks College of Engineering, Aviation and Technology of Saint Louis University
 William Armstrong, 1st Baron Armstrong - industrialist; in 1871 founded College of Physical Science, an early part of the University
 Roy Ascott - new media artist
 Dennis Assanis - Provost and Senior Vice-President for Academic Affairs at Stony Brook University
 Neil Astley - publisher, editor and writer
 Rodney Atkinson - eurosceptic conservative academic
 Rowan Atkinson - comedian and actor
 Kane Avellano - Guinness World Record for youngest person to circumnavigate the world by motorcycle (solo and unsupported) at the age of 23 in 2017

B 

 Bruce Babbitt - U.S. politician; 16th Governor of Arizona (1978–1987); 47th United States Secretary of the Interior (1993–2001); Democrat
 James Baddiley - biochemist, based at Newcastle University 1954–1983; the Baddiley-Clark building is named in part after him
 Tunde Baiyewu - member of the Lighthouse Family
 John C. A. Barrett - clergyman
 G. W. S. Barrow - historian
 Neil Bartlett - chemist, creation of the first noble gas compounds (BSc and PhD at King's College, University of Durham, later Newcastle University)
 Sue Beardsmore - television presenter
 Alan Beith - politician
 Jean Benedetti - biographer, translator, director and dramatist
 Phil Bennion - politician
 Catherine Bertola - contemporary painter
 Simon Best - Captain of the Ulster Rugby team; Prop for the Ireland Team
 Andy Bird - CEO of Disney International
 Rory Jonathan Courtenay Boyle, Viscount Dungarvan - heir apparent to the earldom of Cork
 David Bradley - science writer
 Mike Brearley - professional cricketer, formerly a lecturer in philosophy at the university (1968–1971)
 Constance Briscoe - one of the first black women to sit as a judge in the UK; author of the best-selling autobiography Ugly; found guilty in May 2014 on three charges of attempting to pervert the course of justice; jailed for 16 months
 Steve Brooks - entomologist; attained BSc in Zoology and MSc in Public Health Engineering from Newcastle University in 1976 and 1977 respectively
 Thom Brooks - academic, columnist
 Gavin Brown - academic
 Vicki Bruce - psychologist
 Basil Bunting - poet; Northern Arts Poetry Fellow at Newcastle University (1968–70); honorary DLitt in 1971
 John Burgan - documentary filmmaker
 Mark Burgess - computer scientist
 Sir John Burn - Professor of Clinical Genetics at Newcastle University Medical School; Medical Director and Head of the Institute of Genetics; Newcastle Medical School alumnus
 William Lawrence Burn - historian and lawyer, history chair at King's College, Newcastle (1944–66)
 John Harrison Burnett - botanist, chair of Botany at King's College, Newcastle (1960–68)

C 
 Richard Caddel - poet
 Ann Cairns - President of International Markets for MasterCard
 Deborah Cameron - linguist
 Stuart Cameron - lecturer
 John Ashton Cannon - historian; Professor of Modern History; Head of Department of History from 1976 until his appointment as Dean of the Faculty of Arts in 1979; Pro-Vice-Chancellor 1983–1986
 Ian Carr - musician
 Jimmy Cartmell - rugby player, Newcastle Falcons
 Steve Chapman - Principal and Vice-Chancellor of Heriot-Watt University
 Dion Chen - Hong Kong educator, principal of Ying Wa College and former principal of YMCA of Hong Kong Christian College
 Ashraf Choudhary - scientist
 Chua Chor Teck - Managing Director of Keppel Group
 Jennifer A. Clack - palaeontologist
 George Clarke - architect
 Carol Clewlow - novelist
 Brian Clouston - landscape architect
 Ed Coode -  Olympic gold medallist
 John Coulson - chemical engineering academic
 Caroline Cox, Baroness Cox - cross-bench member of the British House of Lords
 Nicola Curtin – Professor of Experimental Cancer Therapeutics
 Pippa Crerar - Political Editor of the Daily Mirror

D 

 Fred D'Aguiar - author
 Julia Darling - poet, playwright, novelist, MA in Creative Writing
 Simin Davoudi - academic
 Richard Dawson - civil engineering academic and member of the UK Committee on Climate Change
 Katie Doherty - singer-songwriter
 Nowell Donovan - vice-chancellor for academic affairs and Provost of Texas Christian University
 Catherine Douglas - Ig Nobel Prize winner for Veterinary Medicine
 Annabel Dover - artist, studied fine art 1994–1998
 Alexander Downer - Australian Minister for Foreign Affairs (1996–2007)
 Chloë Duckworth - archaeologist and presenter
 Chris Duffield - Town Clerk and Chief Executive of the City of London Corporation

E 
 Michael Earl - academic
 Tom English - drummer, Maxïmo Park
 Princess Eugenie - member of the British royal family. Eugenie is a niece of King Charles III and a granddaughter of Queen Elizabeth II. She began studying at Newcastle University in September 2009, graduating in 2012 with a 2:1 degree in English Literature and History of Art.

F 

 U. A. Fanthorpe - poet
 Frank Farmer - medical physicist; professor of medical physics at Newcastle University in 1966
 Terry Farrell - architect
 Tim Farron - former Liberal Democrat leader and MP for Westmorland and Lonsdale
 Ian Fells - professor
 Andy Fenby - rugby player
 Bryan Ferry - singer, songwriter and musician, member of Roxy Music and solo artist; studied fine art
 E. J. Field - neuroscientist, director of the university's Demyelinating Disease Unit 
 John Niemeyer Findlay - philosopher
 John Fitzgerald - computer scientist
 Vicky Forster - cancer researcher
 Rose Frain - artist

G 
 Hugh Grosvenor, 7th Duke of Westminster - aristocrat, billionaire, businessman and landowner 
 Peter Gibbs - television weather presenter
 Ken Goodall - rugby player
 Peter Gooderham - British ambassador
 Michael Goodfellow - Professor in Microbial Systematics
 Robert Goodwill - politician
 Richard Gordon - author
 Teresa Graham - accountant
 Thomas George Greenwell - National Conservative Member of Parliament

H 

 Sarah Hainsworth - Pro-Vice-Chancellor and Executive Dean of the School of Engineering and Applied Science at Aston University
 Reginald Hall - endocrinologist, Professor of Medicine (1970–1980)
 Alex Halliday - Professor of Geochemistry, University of Oxford
 Richard Hamilton - artist
 Vicki L. Hanson - computer scientist; honorary doctorate in 2017
 Rupert Harden - professional rugby union player
 Tim Head - artist
 Patsy Healey - professor
 Alastair Heathcote - rower
 Dorothy Heathcote - academic
 Adrian Henri - 'Mersey Scene' poet and painter
 Stephen Hepburn - politician
 Jack Heslop-Harrison - botanist
 Tony Hey - computer scientist; honorary doctorate 2007
 Stuart Hill - author
 Jean Hillier - professor
 Ken Hodcroft - Chairman of Hartlepool United; founder of Increased Oil Recovery
 Robert Holden - landscape architect
 Bill Hopkins - composer
 David Horrobin - entrepreneur
 Debbie Horsfield - writer of dramas, including Cutting It
 John House - geographer
 Paul Hudson - weather presenter
 Philip Hunter - educationist
 Ronald Hunt – Art Historian who was librarian at the Art Department
Anya Hurlbert - visual neuroscientist

I 
 Martin Ince - journalist and media adviser, founder of the QS World University Rankings
 Charles Innes-Ker - Marquess of Bowmont and Cessford
 Mark Isherwood - politician
 Jonathan Israel - historian

J 

 Alan J. Jamieson - marine biologist
 George Neil Jenkins - medical researcher
 Caroline Johnson - Conservative Member of Parliament
 Wilko Johnson - guitarist with 1970s British rhythm and blues band Dr. Feelgood
 Rich Johnston - comic book writer and cartoonist
 Anna Jones - businesswoman
 Cliff Jones - computer scientist
 Colin Jones - historian
 David E. H. Jones - chemist
 Francis R. Jones -  poetry translator and Reader in Translation Studies
 Phil Jones - climatologist
 Michael Jopling, Baron Jopling - Member of the House of Lords and the Conservative Party
 Wilfred Josephs - dentist and composer

K 
 Michael King Jr. - civil rights leader; honorary graduate. In November 1967, MLK made a 24-hour trip to the United Kingdom to receive an honorary Doctorate of Civil Law from Newcastle University, becoming the first African American the institution had recognised in this way.
 Panayiotis Kalorkoti - artist; studied B.A. (Hons) in Fine Art (1976–80); Bartlett Fellow in the Visual Arts (1988)
Rashida Karmali - businesswoman
 Jackie Kay - poet, novelist, Professor of Creative Writing
 Paul Kennedy - historian of international relations and grand strategy
 Mark Khangure - neuroradiologist

L 
Joy Labinjo - artist
 Henrike Lähnemann -  German medievalist
 Dave Leadbetter - politician
 Lim Boon Heng - Singapore Minister
 Lin Hsin Hsin - IT inventor, artist, poet and composer
 Anne Longfield - children's campaigner, former Children's Commissioner for England
 Keith Ludeman - businessman

M 

 Jack Mapanje - writer and poet
 Milton Margai - first prime minister of Sierra Leone (medical degree from the Durham College of Medicine, later Newcastle University Medical School)
 Laurence Martin - war studies writer
 Murray Martin, documentary and docudrama filmmaker, co-founder of Amber Film & Photography Collective
 Adrian Martineau – medical researcher and professor of respiratory Infection and immunity at Queen Mary University of London
 Carl R. May - sociologist
 Tom May - professional rugby union player, now with Northampton Saints, and capped by England
 Kate McCann – journalist and television presenter
 Ian G. McKeith – professor of Old Age Psychiatry
 John Anthony McGuckin - Orthodox Christian scholar, priest, and poet
 Wyl Menmuir - novelist
 Zia Mian - physicist
 Richard Middleton - musicologist
 Mary Midgley - moral philosopher
 G.C.J. Midgley - philosopher
 Hermann Moisl - linguist
 Anthony Michaels-Moore - Operatic Baritone
 Joanna Moncrieff - Critical Psychiatrist
 Theodore Morison - Principal of Armstrong College, Newcastle upon Tyne (1919–24)
 Andy Morrell - footballer
 Frank Moulaert - professor
 Mo Mowlam - former British Labour Party Member of Parliament, former Secretary of State for Northern Ireland, lecturer at Newcastle University
 Chris Mullin - former British Labour Party Member of Parliament, author, visiting fellow
 VA Mundella - College of Physical Science, 1884—1887; lecturer in physics at the College, 1891—1896: Professor of Physics at Northern Polytechnic Institute and Principal of Sunderland Technical College. 
 Richard Murphy - architect

N 

Lisa Nandy - British Labour Party Member of Parliament, former Shadow Foreign Secretary
Karim Nayernia - biomedical scientist
Dianne Nelmes - TV producer

O 
 Sally O'Reilly - writer
 Mo O'Toole - former British Labour Party Member of European Parliament

P 

 Ewan Page - founding director of the Newcastle University School of Computing and briefly acting vice-chancellor; later appointed vice-chancellor of the University of Reading
 Rachel Pain - academic
 Amanda Parker - High Sheriff of Lancashire
 Geoff Parling - Leicester Tigers rugby player
 Chris Patten, Baron Patten of Barnes - British Conservative politician and Chancellor of the University (1999–2009)
Chris M Pattinson former Great Britain International Swimmer 1976-1984
 Mick Paynter -  Cornish poet and Grandbard
 Robert A. Pearce - academic
 Hugh Percy, 10th Duke of Northumberland - Chancellor of the University (1964–1988)
 Jonathan Pile - Showbiz Editor, ZOO magazine
 Ben Pimlott - political historian; PhD and lectureship at Newcastle University (1970–79)
 Robin Plackett - statistician
 Alan Plater - playwright and screenwriter
 Ruth Plummer - Professor of Experimental Cancer Medicine at the Northern Institute for Cancer Research and Fellow of the UK's Academy of Medical Sciences.
 Poh Kwee Ong - Deputy President of SembCorp Marine
 John Porter - musician
 Rob Powell - former London Broncos coach
 Stuart Prebble - former chief executive of ITV
 Oliver Proudlock - Made in Chelsea star; creator of Serge De Nîmes clothing line
 Mark Purnell - palaeontologist

Q 

 Pirzada Qasim - Pakistani scholar, Vice Chancellor of the University of Karachi
 Joyce Quin, Baroness Quin - politician

R 

 Andy Raleigh - Rugby League player for Wakefield Trinity Wildcats
 Brian Randell - computer scientist
 Rupert Mitford, 6th Baron Redesdale - Liberal Democrat spokesman in the House of Lords for International Development
 Alastair Reynolds - novelist, former research astronomer with the European Space Agency
 Ben Rice - author
 Lewis Fry Richardson - mathematician, studied at the Durham College of Science in Newcastle
 Matthew White Ridley, 4th Viscount Ridley - Chancellor of the University 1988-1999
 Colin Riordon - VC of Cardiff University, Professor of German Studies (1988–2006)
Susie Rodgers - British Paralympic swimmer
 Nayef Al-Rodhan -  philosopher, neuroscientist, geostrategist, and author
 Neil Rollinson - poet
 Johanna Ropner - Lord lieutenant of North Yorkshire
Sharon Rowlands - CEO of ReachLocal
 Peter Rowlinson - Ig Nobel Prize winner for Veterinary Medicine
 John Rushby - computer scientist
 Camilla Rutherford - actress

S 

 Jonathan Sacks - former Chief Rabbi of the United Hebrew Congregations of the Commonwealth
 Ross Samson - Scottish rugby union footballer; studied history
Helen Scales - marine biologist, broadcaster, and writer
 William Scammell - poet
 Fred B. Schneider - computer scientist; honorary doctorate in 2003
 Sean Scully - painter
 Nigel Shadbolt - computer scientist
 Tom Shakespeare - geneticist
 Jo Shapcott - poet
 James Shapiro - Canadian surgeon and scientist
 Jack Shepherd - actor and playwright
 Mark Shucksmith - professor
 Chris Simms - crime thriller novel author
 Graham William Smith - probation officer, widely regarded as the father of the national probation service
 Iain Smith - Scottish politician
 Paul Smith - singer, Maxïmo Park
 John Snow - discoverer of cholera transmission through water; leader in the adoption of anaesthesia; one of the 8 students enrolled on the very first term of the Medical School
 William Somerville - agriculturist, professor of agriculture and forestry at Durham College of Science (later Newcastle University)
 Ed Stafford - explorer, walked the length of the Amazon River
 Chris Steele-Perkins - photographer
 Chris Stevenson - academic
 Di Stewart - Sky Sports News reader
 Diana Stöcker -  German CDU Member of Parliament
 Miodrag Stojković - genetics researcher
 Miriam Stoppard - physician, author and agony aunt
 Charlie van Straubenzee - businessman and investment executive
 Peter Straughan - playwright and short story writer

T 
 Mathew Tait - rugby union footballer
 Eric Thomas - academic
 David Tibet - cult musician and poet
 Archis Tiku - bassist, Maxïmo Park
 James Tooley - professor
 Elsie Tu - politician
 Maurice Tucker - sedimentologist
 Paul Tucker - member of Lighthouse Family
 George Grey Turner - surgeon
 Ronald F. Tylecote - archaeologist

V 
 Chris Vance - actor in Prison Break and All Saints
 Géza Vermes - scholar
 Geoff Vigar - lecturer
 Hugh Vyvyan - rugby union player

W 

 Alick Walker - palaeontologist
 Matthew Walker - Professor of Neuroscience and Psychology at the University of California, Berkeley
 Tom Walker - Sunday Times foreign correspondent
 Lord Walton of Detchant -  physician; President of the GMC, BMA, RSM; Warden of Green College, Oxford (1983–1989)
 Kevin Warwick - Professor of Cybernetics; former Lecturer in Electrical & Electronic Engineering
 Duncan Watmore - footballer at Middlesbrough F.C.
 Mary Webb - artist
 Charlie Webster - television sports presenter
 Li Wei - Chair of Applied Linguistics at UCL Institute of Education, University College London
 Joseph Joshua Weiss - Professor of Radiation Chemistry
 Robert Westall - children's writer, twice winner of Carnegie Medal
 Thomas Stanley Westoll - Fellow of the Royal Society
 Gillian Whitehead - composer
 William Whitfield - architect, later designed the Hadrian Building and the Northern Stage
 Claire Williams - motorsport executive
 Zoe Williams - sportswoman, worked on Gladiators
 Donald I. Williamson - planktologist and carcinologist
 Philip Williamson - former Chief Executive of Nationwide Building Society
 John Willis - Royal Air Force officer and council member of the University
 Lukas Wooller - keyboard player, Maxïmo Park
 Graham Wylie - co-founder of the Sage Group; studied Computing Science & Statistics BSc and graduated in 1980; awarded an honorary doctorate in 2004

Y 
 Hisila Yami, Nepalese politician and former Minister of Physical Planning and Works (Government of Nepal)
Her Royal Highness Princess Eugenie of York - member of the British royal family; studied Combined Studies BA (Art History, English Literature and Politics)
 John Yorke - Controller of Continuing Drama; Head of Independent Drama at the BBC
 Martha Young-Scholten - linguist
Paul Younger - hydrogeologist

References

External links 
 The Alumni Association at Newcastle University

 
Lists of people by university or college in England
University